Wiseman Mbambo  (b 15 March 1966) is a South African Air Force officer, serving as Chief of the South African Air Force.

He joined the ANC'military wing, Umkhonto Wesizwe at 17 years and received his military training in Angola and Soviet Union. He served in exile as training instructor. General Mbambo was attested into the SANDF in 1994 as a Major.

Mbabmo was appointed Officer Commanding Waterkloof Air Force Base in 2004 before being appointed as Director: Air Force Capability and Plans in 2009. In 2013 he was promoted Major General and appointed GOC Air Command.

Academic qualifications

 BA Mil Science from Frunze – USSR, 1991
 Master's Degree in Strategic Security Studies from the Air University at Maxwell Air Force Base in Montgomery, Alabama in the United States of America, 2004
 Diploma in Ministry Studies from Faith International Bible College Lenasia, 2008
 Diploma in Aviation Safety Management Systems from the University of Southern California, 2012

Awards and decorations

 
 
  with Humanitarian Aid Clasp

References

|-

South African Air Force generals
Living people
1966 births